"Psycho Teddy (Do You Really Really Want To?)", often referred to as "Psycho Teddy (Call to Psycho Teddy)" is a 2008 dance pop song by the fictional character Psycho Teddy, composed by Michael Migusha and Dion Howell. It serves as both a ringtone and a single and was released in Australia on 12 April 2008. Another song, a rendition of "You Should Be Dancing", was released by Psycho Teddy.

Chart performance
In Australia, the song debuted inside the Top 50 based solely on physical singles, and in its third week made a massive jump from number 44 to number 12. The following week, it rose to number five, its peak position, before dropping out of the top 50 to number 70 the next week. It is one of the few songs that has dropped out while still charting in the top five. On the same week, it fell from the number-one position on the Australian Physical Singles Chart to number 20. Two weeks later the single was knocked out of the Top 100. It is one of the fastest rising and falling songs on the ARIA Charts, spending only 6 weeks in the Top 100.

Music video

The music video was created using computerised graphics and features Psycho Teddy in two different appearances, one "cute" and one "psycho". The cute version shows him wearing heart-shaped glasses, hugging himself and jumping around with joy. 

When he changes to his psycho form, he has taken off his glasses and begins acting crazy, spinning around, making faces and jumping about. The video starts and ends with the impression that a television is being switched on and off.

Charts

References

2008 singles
2008 songs
Sony BMG singles